Australian vocal duo Vika and Linda have released eight studio albums, two compilation albums, four live albums and twenty singles.

Albums

Studio albums

Live albums

Soundtrack albums

Compilation albums

Singles

Guest appearances

References

Discographies of Australian artists
Rhythm and blues discographies
Pop music discographies